Japanese-American recording artist Mitski has released six studio albums, three extended plays, and 16 singles. Her fifth studio album, Be the Cowboy, charted in the United States, the United Kingdom, and other territories. Mitski’s sixth studio album, Laurel Hell, proved to be her most successful album to date, peaking at number 5 on the US Billboard 200.

Studio albums

Extended plays

Singles

Other charted songs

Guest appearances

Music videos

Notes

References 

Discographies of American artists
Alternative rock discographies